The GE boxcabs, sometimes also GE IR boxcabs, were diesel-electric switcher locomotives succeeding the ALCO boxcabs. The locomotives were built by General Electric and  Ingersoll Rand without ALCO. Production lasted from 1928 to 1930. These boxcabs were often termed oil-electrics to avoid the use of the German name Diesel, unpopular after World War I.

History 
In 1912, GE combined for the first time an internal combustion engine with electric traction motors. Impetus for wider adoption of this technology was provided by improved control systems introduced around 1920 and the State of New York's Kaufman Act, which banned the use of steam locomotives within the New York metropolitan area. A consortium consisting of ALCO, GE and Ingersoll Rand started series production of the ALCO Boxcabs in 1925. ALCO dropped out of the arrangement in 1928, after acquiring their own diesel engine manufacturer in McIntosh & Seymour and went on to start its own line of diesel switchers. GE and Ingersoll Rand went on with the production of the former ALCO boxcabs, but without ALCO. The locomotives were built in the GE plant in Erie, Pennsylvania, except the unit for Canadian National Railway (CN), which was built by the railroad itself in their workshop. Seventeen examples were built in all.

Models 

All models have chassis and running gear, generator, traction motors and controls from GE, and Ingersoll Rand provided the diesel engine. The principle of operation was the same as modern locomotives, the diesel engine driving a main generator of 600 volts DC with four axle-hung traction motors. In contrast to the ALCO boxcabs having a design with side doors and ladders the GE boxcabs have front doors and end platforms with steps. The underframe was cast steel. The radiator system was sitting on the roof of the locomotive. At each locomotive end a GE Model CD65 motor with a Sturtevant multivane fan was pressing air through the radiators.

Two models were in series production and two versions were only produced once: 
 a 60-Ton locomotive with a six-cylinder four-stroke in-line engine of 300 hp  
 a 100-Ton locomotive with two of the same engines as the 60-Ton model  
 a 120-Ton locomotive with a single six-cylinder 800 hp unit (1 prototype built for Erie Railroad)  
 a 120-Ton locomotive with two of the same engines as the 60-Ton model (1 unit built for CN)

Surviving examples 

The only surviving GE boxcab is the 100-ton unit built in December 1929 and delivered to the contractor Foley Brothers in January 1930. It was used with the road number 110-1 for pulling coal trains in a Northern Pacific Railway owned mine in Coalstrip, Montana until it was withdrawn somewhere in the 1960s and later ended up in the Western Pacific Railroad Museum in Portola, CA. In December 2011 it was moved to the California State Railroad Museum in Sacramento CA.

References

External links

Diesel-electric locomotives of the United States
General Electric locomotives
Standard gauge locomotives of the United States
Railway locomotives introduced in 1928